Ayşe Arman (born 9 December 1969) is a Turkish journalist and columnist of German descent. She is best known for her interviews. Arman is the author of two books, one of which is a compilation of best moments of her interviews made over the past decade. Arman also holds German citizenship.

Personal life 
She was born in her father's hometown of Adana. Her mother is German. After her graduation from Tarsus American College in Tarsus, province Mersin, she attended the School of Press and Publishing at Istanbul University but never been a graduate. She is married to Ömer Dormen, the son of theater actor Haldun Dormen and public relations specialist Betül Mardin. They have one daughter together, named Alya.

Professional life 
Ayşe Arman started her career in journalism in the 1990s within the team of the weekly magazine Nokta. At Hürriyet, she was noted for her frank approach to personal matters. In some of her articles, she has addressed issues such as feminism and LGBT rights. In November 2019, Arman announced her resignation from her post as a columnist for Hürriyet.

Ayşe Arman was also a jury member in the Turkish version of Dancing on Ice started 8 January 2007.

Bibliography
 Kimse Okumazsa Ben Okurum, Epsilon Publishing (2002), 330pp, 
 Kimse Sormazsa Ben Sorarım, Epsilon Publishing (2003), 352pp, 
 Alya, Sevgilim ve Ben, (2009)
 Gezinin Güzel İnsanları, (2013)

References

External links
 Official website
 Archive of articles in Hürriyet 

Tarsus American College alumni
Turkish women journalists
Turkish columnists
Businesspeople from Adana
Living people
German people of Turkish descent
Turkish people of German descent
Turkish women in business
Turkish businesspeople
1969 births
Hürriyet people
Turkish women columnists
Turkish women writers